"Wolf at the Door" is a song performed and composed by English alternative rock band Keane and was the second single they released, originally intended only as a promo item with only fifty copies made, becoming the rarest Keane item in existence.

Recording started on 28 October 2000 and finished in May 2001 even though the record was originally planned to be released before 2001. The CD single was released by the band's own record label, Zoomorphic, in June 2001 and was sold at the pubs where Keane used to play. All fifty copies were handmade and recorded on CD-Rs.

Because of its limited production it is one of the most desired collectors' items amongst Keane fans, and has been known to sell for around £1000 on eBay. Its status as a rarity is such that, allegedly, no member of the band is in possession of a copy.

The single features a re-recording of their previous single "Call Me What You Like", as well as an early version of "She Has No Time", which would later appear on Hopes and Fears, the band's debut album.

Shortly after this record was released, guitarist Dominic Scott left the band, and was Keane's last release with a guitar as part of their instrumentation until the 2007 cover b-side "She Sells Sanctuary".

Track listing

CD single
Catalogue number: ZOO/2/01
"Wolf at the Door"
"Call Me What You Like"
"She Has No Time"

Information about song
The song was composed circa July 2000 and first played at the Monarch pub in Camden, London. It was recorded at Roundhouse Studios and Balfour Studios.

Musical structure
Most people would say the song is reminiscent to Coldplay's "Brothers & Sisters" due to the electric guitar entry in the F#sus4 key, similar to the Asus4 found in the latter.
However, the "epic and dreamlike" Keane sound is still found in the track, with Chaplin and Scott vocals, the guitarist backing.
"Wolf at the Door" is the only 6/8 time signature song by Keane to date.
Length: 4:17
Tempo: approx. 170bpm
Key: F# major
Time signature: 6/8, 8 beat

B-sides

Call Me What You Like

This is a re-recording of the original single, which was slower and longer. The final version was recorded on 19 February 2001. The song was composed circa 1999 by Tom Chaplin.
Length: 3:32
Tempo: 92bpm
Key: Cm
Time signature: 4/4
Style: Alternative

She Has No Time
An acoustic guitar version of the song, unlike the version which appears on Hopes and Fears. It was composed circa January 2001. This version is shorter than the version appearing on the album and features few synthesizer effects.
Length: 5:00
Tempo: 72bpm
Key: Dm
Time signature: 4/4
Style: Alternative, ballad

Cover art and CD box
The black cover of the single reads "keane" when opened and every letter forming the word is made out of "wolf at the door" marks. The inside cover includes data about the band and their manager, Adam Tudhope, all contained inside a common CD box. It was designed by Joe McAllister.

Notes

External links
Official site
Keane.fr - Information about record in French

2001 singles
Keane (band) songs
Songs written by Tim Rice-Oxley
Songs written by Tom Chaplin
Songs written by Richard Hughes (musician)
Songs written by Dominic Scott
2001 songs